Catullus 7 is a poem by Catullus addressed to his mistress Lesbia.  Similar to Catullus 5, this poem revels in counting kisses, with a touch of stellar voyeurism.

The meter of this poem is hendecasyllabic, a common form in Catullus' poetry.



Latin text and translation

Footnotes

Bibliography

External links
 Carmina for some of the texts in Latin.
 Gaius Valerius Catullus

C007
Love poems
Kissing